The Munsee are a subtribe of the Lenape.

Munsee may also refer to:

Munsee-Delaware Nation, a Lenape First Nation in southwest Ontario, Canada
Munsee-Delaware Nation Indian Reserve No. 1, part of the above
Munsee grammar
Munsee language
Christian Munsee
Stockbridge-Munsee Community
USS Munsee (ATF-107), an Abnaki-class fleet ocean tug

See also
Muncie (disambiguation)
Muncey, surname
Muncy (disambiguation)
Munsey (disambiguation)
Mansi (disambiguation)
Minsi (disambiguation)